Hasslö GoIF is a Swedish football club located in Hasslö.

Background
Hasslö GoIF currently plays in Division 5 Blekinge which is the seventh tier of Swedish football. They play their home matches at the Skärgårdsvallen in Hasslö.

The club is affiliated to Blekinge Fotbollförbund. Hasslö GoIF have competed in the Svenska Cupen on 14 occasions.

Season to season

References

External links
 Hasslö GoIF – Official website

Football clubs in Blekinge County
Association football clubs established in 1934
1934 establishments in Sweden